Thomas Songin (born December 20, 1953) is an American former professional ice hockey player who played 43 games in the National Hockey League (NHL) with the Boston Bruins between 1978 and 1981. He recorded five goals and five assists.

Biography
A native of Norwood, Massachusetts, Songin is the nephew of professional football player Butch Songin. He played scholastic ice hockey at Mount Saint Charles Academy (MSC) and Northwood School, leading MSC to the Rhode Island state championship in 1971–72 as the state scoring champion with 27 goals and 43 assists. Songin went on to attend Boston College, where he earned eight varsity letters as a star baseball and ice hockey player. A power-hitting shortstop on the baseball diamond, he played collegiate summer baseball with the Yarmouth Red Sox of the Cape Cod Baseball League in 1974, and returned to the league in 1975 and 1976 to play for the Orleans Cardinals.

Songin was undrafted out of college, and went on to play in parts of three seasons for the Boston Bruins. His first NHL goal came in Toronto on December 5, 1978 in Boston's 5-1 victory over the Maple Leafs. Songin was an assistant coach at the University of Massachusetts Boston in 1988–89, and was inducted into the Boston College Varsity Club Hall of Fame in 1996, and the Mount Saint Charles Athletic Hall of Fame in 2012.

Career statistics

Regular season and playoffs

References

External links
 

1953 births
Living people
American men's ice hockey right wingers
Binghamton Dusters players
Birmingham South Stars players
Boston Bruins players
Boston College Eagles baseball players
Boston College Eagles men's ice hockey players
Erie Blades players
Ice hockey players from Massachusetts
Long Beach Sharks players
Mount Saint Charles Academy alumni
Orleans Firebirds players
People from Norwood, Massachusetts
Rochester Americans players
Springfield Indians players
Undrafted National Hockey League players
Yarmouth–Dennis Red Sox players